The Mount Ephraim Public Schools are a community public school district that serves students in pre-kindergarten through eighth grade from Mount Ephraim, in Camden County, New Jersey, United States.

As of the 2018–19 school year, the district, comprised of two schools, had an enrollment of 413 students and 38.0 classroom teachers (on an FTE basis), for a student–teacher ratio of 10.9:1.

The district is classified by the New Jersey Department of Education as being in District Factor Group "CD", the sixth-highest of eight groupings. District Factor Groups organize districts statewide to allow comparison by common socioeconomic characteristics of the local districts. From lowest socioeconomic status to highest, the categories are A, B, CD, DE, FG, GH, I and J.

For ninth through twelfth grades, public school students attend Audubon High School, in Audubon, as part of a sending/receiving relationship with the Audubon School District. As of the 2018–19 school year, the high school had an enrollment of 804 students and 66.5 classroom teachers (on an FTE basis), for a student–teacher ratio of 12.1:1.

History
In July 1926, Mount Ephraim announced that it would starting sending students in ninth grade to the new Audubon High School, while students in grades 10-12 would continue their education at Haddon Heights High School.

Schools
Schools in the district (with 2018–19 enrollment data from the National Center for Education Statistics) are:
Mary Bray Elementary School with 240 students in grades PreK-4
Michael Hunter, Principal
Raymond W. Kershaw Middle School with 162 students in grades 5-8
Laura Venello, Principal

Administration
Core members of the district's administration are:
Michael Hunter, Superintendent
Christopher Eberly, School Business Administrator / Board Secretary

Board of education
The district's board of education, comprised of nine members, sets policy and oversees the fiscal and educational operation of the district through its administration. As a Type II school district, the board's trustees are elected directly by voters to serve three-year terms of office on a staggered basis, with three seats up for election each year held (since 2012) as part of the November general election. The board appoints a superintendent to oversee the district's day-to-day operations and a business administrator to supervise the business functions of the district.

References

External links
Mount Ephraim Public Schools

School Data for the Mount Ephraim Public Schools, National Center for Education Statistics

Mount Ephraim, New Jersey
New Jersey District Factor Group CD
School districts in Camden County, New Jersey